Paweł Dadlez (1 February 1904 – 18 May 1940) was a Polish painter. His work was part of the painting event in the art competition at the 1936 Summer Olympics. He was killed during World War II.

References

External links
 

1904 births
1940 deaths
20th-century Polish painters
20th-century Polish male artists
Olympic competitors in art competitions
Place of birth missing
Polish male painters
Polish people who died in the Holocaust
Polish civilians killed in World War II